Domenico Carpinoni (1566 – 11 June 1658) was an Italian painter of the Renaissance period. He was born at Clusone in the Valle Seriana. He was sent to Venice when young, and became a pupil of the younger Palma il Giovane. He painted a Birth of St. John the Baptist and Descent from the Cross for the principal church of Clusone a Transfiguration for the Chiesa di Monasterolo del Castello in the Valle Cavallina, and an Adoration of the Magi for the church of the Padri Osservanti at Lovere.

References

1566 births
1658 deaths
People from Clusone
16th-century Italian painters
Italian male painters
17th-century Italian painters
Renaissance painters
Painters from Venice